James Bryant House is a historic home located near Harris Crossroads, Moore County, North Carolina. It is dated to about 1820, and is a two-story, three-bay, single-pile frame farmhouse.  It rests on a fieldstone pier foundation, has a gable roof, shed porch, and rear shed rooms.  The house has been restored. It was added to the National Register of Historic Places in 1982.

The McLendon Cabin beside the house served as a detached kitchen after the larger house was built. It was constructed by early settler Joel McLendon . The one-room log dwelling, representative of those built by the early settlers of the region, is the oldest house in Moore County on its original location. It has been described as "a well-proportioned structure whose early features reflect exacting workmanship." It was restored in 1970 by the Moore County Historical Association.

References

External links 
 McLendon Cabin at the Moore County Historical Association website

Houses completed in 1760
Log buildings and structures on the National Register of Historic Places in North Carolina
Houses on the National Register of Historic Places in North Carolina
Houses completed in 1820
Houses in Moore County, North Carolina
National Register of Historic Places in Moore County, North Carolina